James Frederick Arnold (6 June 1859 – 10 July 1929) was a New Zealand Member of Parliament of the Liberal Party for various Dunedin electorates.

Private life
Born in Saint Peter Port, Guernsey, on 6 June 1859, Arnold was the son of Julius Arnold. The family emigrated to New Zealand in 1864. James Arnold went on to become a bootmaker and trade union leader. He was known as "the bootmakers lawyer" at the Industrial Conciliation & Arbitration (ICA) Court.

Member of Parliament

Arnold represented City of Dunedin (–1905), Dunedin South (–1908) and Dunedin Central (–1911) in the New Zealand House of Representatives.

At the 1905 election, Arnold stressed his Independent credentials and said that the "present administration [i.e. Premier Richard Seddon's Liberal Government] were not all they should be", favoured the elective executive bill, and held himself at liberty to compel the Ministry to reconstruct.

Death
Arnold died at his home in Timaru on 10 July 1929, and was buried at Timaru Cemetery.

Notes

References

The New Liberal Party 1905 by G.F. Whitcher (1966, MA Thesis-University of Canterbury, Christchurch)

1859 births
1929 deaths
Independent MPs of New Zealand
New Zealand Liberal Party MPs
New Zealand trade unionists
Guernsey emigrants to New Zealand
New Zealand MPs for Dunedin electorates
Members of the New Zealand House of Representatives
Unsuccessful candidates in the 1911 New Zealand general election
19th-century New Zealand politicians
Guernsey people
Burials at Timaru Cemetery